Lakhta (also described as Kholm, Katunino, Novodvinsk, Lahta, or Pervomaysk) is a naval air base in Arkhangelsk Oblast, Russia located 22 km southeast of Arkhangelsk.  It was home to 574 MRAP (574th Maritime Missile Aviation Regiment) flying Tupolev Tu-16 and Tupolev Tu-22M3 bombers.  It is capable of nuclear weapons storage.

By 2006 Google Earth showed only two Tu-22M bombers, which were removed shortly afterward.  Panoramio photos taken in 2010 show an auto rally on the old runway and extensive overgrowth, indicating the facility was abandoned in the mid or late 2000s.

References

Russian Naval Aviation
Soviet Naval Aviation bases
Buildings and structures in Arkhangelsk Oblast
Aviation in Arkhangelsk Oblast
Installations of the Russian Navy